The Indonesia women's national volleyball team represents Indonesia in international women's volleyball competitions and friendly matches.

It appeared at the Women's Asian Volleyball Championship 20 times, its best position was 5th place at the 1979 event.

Current roster
The following is the Indonesia roster in the 2021 Southeast Asian Games.

Head coach:  Risco Herlambang

Competition history

Asian Women's Volleyball Championship
  1975 – Did not participate
  1979 – 5th place
  1983 – 6th place
  1987 – 6th place
  1989 – 9th place
  1991 – 9th place
  1993 – 8th place
  1995 – Did not participate
  1997 – Did not participate
  1999 – Did not participate
  2001 – Did not participate
  2003 – Did not participate
  2005 – Did not participate
  2007 – 9th place
  2009 – 13th place
  2011 – 13th place
  2013 – 10th place
  2015 – Did not participate
  2017 – Did not participate
  2019 – 8th place

AVC Cup
 2008 – Did not qualify
 2010 – Did not qualify
 2012 – Did not qualify
 2014 – Did not qualify
 2016 – Did not enter
 2018 – Did not enter
 2022 – Qualified but withdrew

Asian Games
 1958 – Did not participate
 1962 –  Bronze Medal
 1966 – Did not participate
 1970 – 7th place
 1974 – Did not participate
 1978 – Did not participate
 1982 – Did not participate
 1986 – 5th place
 1990 – Did not participate
 1994 – Did not participate
 1998 – Did not participate
 2002 – Did not participate
 2006 – Did not participate
 2010 – Did not participate
 2014 – Did not participate
 2018 – 7th place

Southeast Asian Games
 1977 —  Silver Medal
 1979 —  Silver Medal
 1981 —  Silver Medal
 1983 —  Gold Medal 
 1985 —  Bronze Medal
 1987 —  Silver Medal 
 1989 —  Silver Medal 
 1991 —  Silver Medal  
 1993 —  Bronze Medal 
 1995 — 4th place 
 1997 —  Bronze Medal
 2001 — 4th place  
 2003 — 4th place 
 2005 — 4th place  
 2007 —  Bronze Medal 
 2009 —  Bronze Medal 
 2011 —  Bronze Medal 
 2013 —  Bronze Medal
 2015 —  Bronze Medal 
 2017 —  Silver Medal
 2019 —  Bronze Medal
 2021 —  Bronze Medal

ASEAN Grand Prix
 2019 First Leg —  Silver Medal
 2019 Second Leg —  Silver Medal
 2022 —  Bronze Medal

References

External links
Indonesia Volleyball Federation

National women's volleyball teams
Volleyball
Volleyball in Indonesia
Women's sport in Indonesia